Morad Ali Shirani (born 21 March 1955, in Isfahan) is a retired Greco-Roman wrestler from Iran. He won a bronze medal at the 1977 World Championships. He also participated at the 1976 Summer Olympics.

References

External links
 

Iranian male sport wrestlers
World Wrestling Championships medalists
Wrestlers at the 1976 Summer Olympics
Olympic wrestlers of Iran
Living people
1955 births
Sportspeople from Isfahan
20th-century Iranian people